New Caledonia is a sui generis collectivity of overseas France in the southwest Pacific Ocean, south of Vanuatu, about  east of Australia, and  from Metropolitan France. The archipelago, part of the Melanesia subregion, includes the main island of Grande Terre, the Loyalty Islands, the Chesterfield Islands, the Belep archipelago, the Isle of Pines, and a few remote islets. The Chesterfield Islands are in the Coral Sea. French people, especially locals, call Grande Terre "" ("the pebble").

New Caledonia has a land area of  divided into three provinces. The North and South Provinces are on the New Caledonian mainland, while the Loyalty Islands Province is a series of three islands off the east coast of mainland. New Caledonia's population of 271,407 (October 2019 census) is of diverse origins and varies by geography; in the North  and Loyalty Islands Provinces, the indigenous Kanak people predominate, while the wealthy South Province contains significant populations of European (Caldoches and Metropolitan French), Kanak, and Polynesian (mostly Wallisian) origin, as well as smaller groups of Southeast Asian, Pied-Noir, and North African heritage. The capital of New Caledonia is Nouméa.

History 
New Caledonia was part of the continent Zealandia, which broke off from the supercontinent Gondwana between 79 million and 83 million years ago. The earliest traces of human presence in New Caledonia date back to the period when the Lapita culture was influential in large parts of the Pacific, c. 1600–500 BCE or 1300–200 BCE. The Lapita were highly skilled navigators and agriculturists. The first settlements were concentrated around the coast and date back to the period between c. 1100 BCE to 200 CE.

British explorer James Cook was the first European to sight New Caledonia, on 4 September 1774, during his second voyage. He named it "New Caledonia", as the northeast of the island reminded him of Scotland. The west coast of Grande Terre was approached by the Comte de Lapérouse in 1788, shortly before his disappearance, and the Loyalty Islands were first visited between 1793 and 1796 when Mare, Lifou, Tiga, and Ouvea were mapped by English whaler William Raven. Raven encountered the island, then named Britania, and today known as Maré (Loyalty Is.), in November 1793. From 1796 until 1840, only a few sporadic contacts with the archipelago were recorded. About 50 American whalers left record of being in the region (Grande Terre, Loyalty Is., Walpole and Hunter) between 1793 and 1887. Contacts with visiting ships became more frequent after 1840, because of their interest in sandalwood.

As trade in sandalwood declined, it was replaced by a new business enterprise, "blackbirding", a euphemism for taking Melanesian or Western Pacific Islanders from New Caledonia, the Loyalty Islands, New Hebrides, New Guinea, and the Solomon Islands into slavery, indentured or forced labour in the sugarcane plantations in Fiji and Queensland by various methods of trickery and deception. Blackbirding was practised by both French and Australian traders, but in New Caledonia's case, the trade in the early decades of the twentieth century involved kidnapping children from the Loyalty Islands to the Grand Terre for forced labour in plantation agriculture. New Caledonia's primary experience with blackbirding revolved around a trade from the New Hebrides (now Vanuatu) to the Grand Terre for labour in plantation agriculture, mines, as well as guards over convicts and in some public works. In the early years of the trade, coercion was used to lure Melanesian islanders onto ships. In later years indenture systems were developed; however, when it came to the French slave trade, which took place between its Melanesian colonies of the New Hebrides and New Caledonia, very few regulations were implemented. This represented a departure from contemporary developments in Australia, since increased regulations were developed to mitigate the abuses of blackbirding and 'recruitment' strategies on the coastlines.

The first missionaries from the London Missionary Society and the Marist Brothers arrived in the 1840s. In 1849, the crew of the American ship Cutter was killed and eaten by the Pouma clan. Cannibalism was widespread throughout New Caledonia.

French colonisation 

On 24 September 1853, under orders from Emperor Napoleon III, Admiral Febvrier Despointes took formal possession of New Caledonia. Captain Louis-Marie-François Tardy de Montravel founded Port-de-France (Nouméa) on 25 June 1854. A few dozen free settlers settled on the west coast in the following years. New Caledonia became a penal colony in 1864, and from the 1860s until the end of the transportations in 1897, France sent about 22,000 criminals and political prisoners to New Caledonia. The  for 1888 indicates that 10,428 convicts, including 2,329 freed ones, were on the island as of 1 May 1888, by far the largest number of convicts detained in French overseas penitentiaries. The convicts included many Communards, arrested after the failed Paris Commune of 1871, including Henri de Rochefort and Louise Michel. Between 1873 and 1876, 4,200 political prisoners were "relegated" to New Caledonia. Only 40 of them settled in the colony; the rest returned to France after being granted amnesty in 1879 and 1880.

In 1864, nickel was discovered on the banks of the Diahot River; with the establishment of the Société Le Nickel in 1876, mining began in earnest. To work the mines the French imported labourers from neighbouring islands and from the New Hebrides, and later from Japan, the Dutch East Indies, and French Indochina. The French government also attempted to encourage European immigration, without much success.

The indigenous Kanak people were excluded from the French economy and from mining work, and ultimately confined to reservations. This sparked a violent reaction in 1878, when High Chief Ataï of La Foa managed to unite many of the central tribes and launched a guerrilla war that killed 200 Frenchmen and 1,000 Kanaks. A  occurred in 1917, with Protestant missionaries like Maurice Leenhardt functioning as witnesses to the events of this war. Leenhardt would pen a number of ethnographic works on the Kanak of New Caledonia. Noël of Tiamou led the 1917 rebellion, which resulted in a number of orphaned children, one of whom was taken into the care of Protestant missionary Alphonse Rouel. This child, Wenceslas Thi, would become the father of Jean-Marie Tjibaou (1936–1989).

Europeans brought new diseases such as smallpox and measles, which caused the deaths of many natives. The Kanak population declined from around 60,000 in 1878 to 27,100 in 1921, and their numbers did not increase again until the 1930s.

In June 1940, after the fall of France, the Conseil Général of New Caledonia voted unanimously to support the Free French government, and in September the pro-Vichy governor was forced to leave for Indochina.

In 1941, some 300 men from the territory volunteered for service overseas. They were joined, in April, by 300 men from French Polynesia ('the Tahitians'), plus a handful from the French districts of the New Hebrides: together they formed the Bataillon du Pacifique (BP). The Caledonians formed two of the companies, and the Polynesians the other two. In May 1941, they sailed to Australia and boarded the RMS Queen Elizabeth for the onward voyage to Africa. They joined the other Free French (FF) battalions in Qastina in August, before moving to the Western Desert with the 1st FF Brigade (1re BFL). There they were one of the four battalions who took part in the breakout after the Battle of Bir Hakeim in 1942. Their losses could not easily be replaced from the Pacific and they were therefore amalgamated with the Frenchmen of another battalion wearing the anchor of 'la Coloniale', the BIM, to form the: Bataillon de l'infanterie de marine et du Pacifique (BIMP). The combined battalion formed part of the Gaulliste 1re Division Motorisée d'Infanterie/Division de Marche d'Infanterie (DMI), alongside three divisions from the French North African forces, in the French Expeditionary Corps (CEF) during the Italian Campaign. They landed in Provence in 1944, when they were posted out and replaced by local French volunteers and résistants.

Meanwhile, in March 1942, with the assistance of Australia, New Caledonia became an important Allied base, and the main South Pacific Fleet base of the United States Navy in the South Pacific moved to Nouméa in 1942–1943. The fleet that turned back the Japanese Navy in the Battle of the Coral Sea in May 1942 was based at Nouméa. American troops stationed on New Caledonia numbered as many as 50,000, matching the entire local population at the time.

French overseas territory 
In 1946, New Caledonia became an overseas territory. By 1953, French citizenship had been granted to all New Caledonians, regardless of ethnicity.

During the late 1940s and early 1950s, New Caledonia strengthened its economic links with Australia, particularly as turmoil within France and its empire weakened New Caledonia's traditional economic links to metropolitan France; New Caledonia supplied nickel to Australia in exchange for coal vital for smelting nickel. New Caledonian exports of iron ore and timber to Australia also increased during this time period.

The European and Polynesian populations gradually increased in the years leading to the nickel boom of 1969–1972, and the indigenous Kanak Melanesians became a minority, though they were still the largest ethnic group.

Between 1976 and 1988, conflicts between French government actions and the Kanak independence movement saw periods of serious violence and disorder. In 1983, a statute of "enlarged autonomy" for the territory proposed a five-year transition period and a referendum in 1989. In March 1984, the Front Indépendantiste, a Kanak resistance group, seized farms and the Kanak and Socialist National Liberation Front (FLNKS) formed a provisional government. In January 1985, the French Socialist government offered sovereignty to the Kanaks and legal protection for European settlers. The plan faltered as violence escalated. The government declared a state of emergency; however, regional elections went ahead, and the FLNKS won control of three out of four provinces. The centre-right government elected in France in March 1986 began eroding the arrangements established under the Socialists, redistributing lands mostly without consideration of native land claims, resulting in over two-thirds going to Europeans and less than a third to the Kanaks. By the end of 1987, roadblocks, gun battles and the destruction of property culminated in the Ouvéa cave hostage taking, a dramatic hostage crisis on the eve of the presidential elections in France. Pro-independence militants on Ouvéa killed four gendarmes and took 27 hostage. The military assaulted the cave to rescue the hostages. Nineteen Kanak hostage takers were killed and another three died in custody, while two soldiers were killed during the assault.

The Matignon Agreements, signed on 26 June 1988, ensured a decade of stability. The Nouméa Accord, signed 5 May 1998, set the groundwork for a 20-year transition that gradually transfers competences to the local government.

In 2008, six lagoons of the New Caledonian barrier reef, the world's longest continuous barrier reef system, were inscribed on the UNESCO World Heritage List.

Following the timeline set by the Nouméa Accord that stated a vote must take place by the end of 2018, the groundwork was laid for a referendum on full independence from France at a meeting chaired by the French Prime Minister Édouard Philippe on 2 November 2017, to be held by November 2018. Voter list eligibility was the subject of a long dispute, but the details were resolved in an electoral list that granted automatic eligibility to voters of Kanak origin but excluded those of other origins who had not been longtime residents of the territory. The referendum was held on 4 November 2018, with independence being rejected.

Another referendum was held in October 2020, with voters once again choosing to remain a part of France. In the 2018 referendum, 56.7% of voters chose to remain in France. In the 2020 referendum, this percentage dropped with 53.4% of voters choosing to remain part of France.
 
The third referendum was held on 12 December 2021. The referendum was boycotted by pro-independence forces, who argued for a delayed vote due to the impact caused by the COVID-19 pandemic; when the French government declined to do so, they called for a boycott. This led to 96% of voters choosing to stay with France.

Politics 

New Caledonia is a territory sui generis to which France has gradually transferred certain powers. As such its citizens have French nationality and vote for the president of France. They have the right to vote in elections to the European Parliament. It is governed by a 54-member Territorial Congress, a legislative body composed of members of three provincial assemblies. The French State is represented in the territory by a High Commissioner. At a national level, New Caledonia is represented in the French Parliament by two deputies and two senators. At the 2012 French presidential election, the voter turnout in New Caledonia was 61.19%.

For 25 years, the party system in New Caledonia was dominated by the anti-independence The Rally–UMP. This dominance ended with the emergence of a new party, Avenir Ensemble, also opposed to independence, but considered more open to dialogue with the Kanak movement, which is part of the Kanak and Socialist National Liberation Front, a coalition of several pro-independence groups.

Customary authority 
Kanak society has several layers of customary authority, from the 4,000–5,000 family-based clans to the eight customary areas (aires coutumières) that make up the territory. Clans are led by clan chiefs and constitute 341 tribes, each headed by a tribal chief. The tribes are further grouped into 57 customary chiefdoms (chefferies), each headed by a head chief, and forming the administrative subdivisions of the customary areas.

The Customary Senate is the assembly of the various traditional councils of the Kanaks, and has jurisdiction over the law proposals concerning the Kanak identity. The Customary Senate is composed of 16 members appointed by each traditional council, with two representatives per customary area. In its advisory role, the Customary Senate must be consulted on law proposals "concerning the Kanak identity" as defined in the Nouméa Accord. It also has a deliberative role on law proposals that would affect identity, the civil customary statute, and the land system. A new president is appointed each year in August or September, and the presidency rotates between the eight customary areas.

Kanak people have recourse to customary authorities regarding civil matters such as marriage, adoption, inheritance, and some land issues. The French administration typically respects decisions made in the customary system. However, their jurisdiction is sharply limited in penal matters, as some matters relating to the customary justice system, including the use of corporal punishment, are seen as clashing with the human rights obligations of France.

Military and Gendarmerie 
The Armed Forces of New Caledonia (or ) include about 2,000 soldiers, mainly deployed in Koumac, Nandaï, Tontouta, Plum, and Nouméa. The land forces consist of a regiment of the Troupes de marine, the Régiment d'infanterie de marine du Pacifique. About 80 percent of the 700-member regiment is composed of soldiers on short-term (four month) deployments from metropolitan France. As of 2018, only about 30 personnel in the regiment were locally recruited.

In early 2023, La Glorieuse is to be replaced by Auguste Benebig, the lead ship of the new Félix Éboué class of patrol vessels. The French Navy will further reinforce its offshore patrol capabilities in New Caledonia by deploying a second vessel of the class (Jean Tranape) to the territory by 2025. One Engins de Débarquement Amphibie – Standards (EDA-S) landing craft is also to be delivered to naval forces based in New Caledonia by 2025. The landing craft is to better support coastal and riverine operations in the territory. 

As of the latter 2010s, French naval aviation and air force elements in New Caledonia included two Navy Falcon 200 Gardian maritime surveillance aircraft (drawn from Flotilla 25F), which are to be replaced by the more modern Falcon 2000 Albatros starting in 2025 and two Casa CN235 transport aircraft and three Puma helicopters from the Air Force's 52 “Tontouta” Squadron.Prior to 2022, the frigate Vendémiaire operated the Alouette III helicopter. However, with the retirement of the type in 2022, it is being replaced by the Eurocopter Dauphin N3. In 2022, the French Air Force demonstrated a capacity to reinforce the territory by deploying three Rafale fighters, supported by A400M transport aircraft and A330 MRTT Phénix tankers, from France to New Caledonia for a three-week exercise.

In addition, some 855 personnel from the National Gendarmerie are stationed on the archipelago divided into 4 companies, 27 brigades and several specialized and mobile Gendarmerie units. During periods such the 2021 referendum on independence, these forces have been significantly reinforced with personnel deployed from metropolitan France.The air component includes two Écureuil helicopters while the Maritime Gendarmerie deploys the patrol boat Dumbea in the territory.

Status 

New Caledonia has been a member of the Pacific Community since 1983 with Nouméa the home of the organization's regional headquarters. Since 1986, the United Nations Committee on Decolonization has included New Caledonia on the United Nations list of non-self-governing territories. An independence referendum was held the following year, but independence was rejected by a large majority.

Under the Nouméa Accord, signed in 1998 following a period of secessionist unrest in the 1980s and approved in a referendum, New Caledonia was granted special status. Twenty years after inception, the Nouméa Accord required an referendum on independence which was held on 4 November 2018. The result was that 56.9% of voters chose to remain with France. The Nouméa Accord required another independence referendum, which was held on 4 October 2020. The result was that 53.26% of voters chose to remain with France. The third and last referendum permitted by the Nouméa Accord was held on 12 December 2021, confirming New Caledonia as part of the French Republic with 96% voting "no" to independence after the vote was boycotted by the bulk of the Kanak population.

The official name of the territory, could be changed in the near future due to the accord, which states that "a name, a flag, an anthem, a motto, and the design of banknotes will have to be sought by all parties together, to express the Kanak identity and the future shared by all parties." To date, however, there has been no consensus on a new name for the territory, although Kanak Republic is popular among 40% of the population. New Caledonia has increasingly adopted its own symbols, choosing an anthem, a motto, and a new design for its banknotes. In July 2010, the Congress of New Caledonia voted in favour of a wish to fly the Kanak flag of the independence movement FLNKS alongside the French tricolour, as dual flags of the territory. The wish, legally non-binding, proved controversial. A majority of New Caledonian communes, but not all, now fly both flags, the rest flying only the French Tricolour. The non-official adoption made New Caledonia one of the few countries or territories in the world with two flags. The decision to wish for the use of two flags has been a constant battleground between the two sides and led the coalition government to collapse in February 2011.

Administrative divisions 

The institutional organization is the result of the organic law and ordinary law passed by the Parliament on 16 February 1999.

The archipelago is divided into three provinces:
 South Province (province Sud). Provincial capital: Nouméa. Area: 9,407 km2. Population: 203,142 inhabitants (2019).
 North Province (province Nord). Provincial capital: Koné. Area: 7,348 km2. Population: 49,912 inhabitants (2019).
 Loyalty Islands Province (province des îles Loyauté). Provincial capital: Lifou. Area: 1,981 km2. Population: 18,353 inhabitants (2019).

New Caledonia is further divided into 33 communes (municipalities). One commune, Poya, is divided between two provinces. The northern half of Poya, with the main settlement and most of the population, is part of the North Province, while the southern half of the commune, with only 210 inhabitants in 2019, is part of the South Province. The communes, with 2019 populations in brackets, and administrative centres, are as follows:

Geography 

New Caledonia is part of Zealandia, a fragment of the ancient Gondwana super-continent. It is speculated that New Caledonia separated from Australia roughly 66 million years ago, subsequently drifting in a north-easterly direction, reaching its present position about 50 million years ago.

The mainland is divided in length by a central mountain range whose highest peaks are Mont Panié in the north and Mont Humboldt in the southeast. The east coast is covered by a lush vegetation. The west coast, with its large savannahs and plains suitable for farming, is a drier area. Many ore-rich massifs are found along this coast.

Most of the island is covered by wet evergreen forests, while savannahs dominate the lower elevations. The lagoon and the surrounding New Caledonia Barrier Reef was named a UNESCO World Heritage Site in 2008 for its exceptional beauty and marine biodiversity.

Climate 
The climate is tropical, with a hot and humid season from November to March with temperatures between 27 °C and 30 °C, and a cooler, dry season from June to August with temperatures between 20 °C and 23 °C, linked by two short interstices. The tropical climate is strongly moderated by the oceanic influence and the trade winds that attenuate humidity, which can be close to 80%. The average annual temperature is 23 °C, with historical extremes of 2.3 °C and 39.1 °C.

The rainfall records show that precipitation differs greatly within the island. The  of rainfall recorded in Galarino are three times the average of the west coast. There are also dry periods, because of the effects of El Niño. The last cyclone affecting New Caledonia was Cyclone Niran, in March 2021.

Environment 

New Caledonia has many unique taxa, especially birds and plants. It has the richest diversity in the world per square kilometre. The biodiversity is caused by Grande Terre's central mountain range, which has created a variety of niches, landforms and micro-climates where endemic species thrive.

Largely due to its nickel industry, New Caledonia emits a high level of carbon dioxide per person compared to other countries. In 2019 it emitted 55.25 tons of CO2 per person, compared to 4.81 for France. The combination of the exceptional biodiversity of New Caledonia and its threatened status has made it one of the most critical biodiversity hotspots on Earth.

Bruno Van Peteghem was in 2001 awarded the Goldman Environmental Prize for his efforts on behalf of the Caledonian ecological protection movement in the face of "serious challenges" from Jacques Lafleur's RPCR party. Progress has been made in a few areas in addressing the protection of New Caledonia's ecological diversity from fire, industrial and residential development, unrestricted agricultural activity and mining (such as the judicial revocation of INCO's mining licence in June 2006 owing to claimed abuses).

Flora 

New Caledonia's fauna and flora derive from ancestral species isolated in the region when it broke away from Gondwana many tens of millions of years ago. Not only endemic species have evolved here, but entire genera, families, and even orders are unique to the islands.

More tropical gymnosperm species are endemic to New Caledonia than to any similar region on Earth. Of the 44 indigenous species of gymnosperms, 43 are endemic, including the only known parasitic gymnosperm (Parasitaxus usta). Also, of the 35 known species of Araucaria, 13 are endemic to New Caledonia. New Caledonia also has the world's most divergent lineage of flowering plant, Amborella trichopoda, which is at, or near, the base of the clade of all flowering plants.

The world's largest extant species of fern, Cyathea intermedia, also is endemic to New Caledonia. It is very common on acid ground, and grows about one metre per year on the east coast, usually on fallow ground or in forest clearings. There also are other species of Cyathea, notably Cyathea novae-caledoniae.

New Caledonia also is one of five regions on the planet where species of southern beeches (Nothofagus) are indigenous; five species are known to occur here.

New Caledonia has its own version of maquis (maquis minier) occurring on metalliferous soils, mostly in the south. The soils of ultramafic rocks (mining terrains) have been a refuge for many native flora species which are adapted to the toxic mineral content of the soils, to which most foreign species of plants are poorly suited, which has therefore prevented invasion into the habitat or displacement of indigenous plants.

Two terrestrial ecoregions lie within New Caledonia's territory: New Caledonia rain forests and New Caledonia dry forests.

Fauna 

In addition to its outstanding plant diversity and endemism, New Caledonia also provides habitat for a wide diversity of animals. Over 100 bird species live in New Caledonia, of which 24 are endemic. One of these endemic bird species is the New Caledonian crow, a bird noted for its tool-making abilities, which rival those of primates. These crows are renowned for their extraordinary intelligence and ability to fashion tools to solve problems, and make the most complex tools of any animal yet studied apart from humans.

The endemic kagu, agile and able to run quickly, is a flightless bird, but it is able to use its wings to climb branches or glide. Its sound is similar to the bark of a dog. It is the surviving member of monotypic family Rhynochetidae, order Eurypygiformes.

There are 11 endemic fish species and 14 endemic species of decapod crustaceans in the rivers and lakes of New Caledonia. Some, such as Neogalaxias, exist only in small areas. The nautilus—considered a living fossil and related to the ammonites, which became extinct at the end of the Mesozoic era—occurs in Pacific waters around New Caledonia. There is a large diversity of marine fish in the surrounding waters, which are within the extents of the Coral Sea.

Despite its large number of bird, reptile, and fish species, New Caledonia has remarkably few mammal species: nine, of which six are endemic.

Several species of New Caledonia are remarkable for their size: Ducula goliath is the largest extant species of arboreal pigeon; Rhacodactylus leachianus, the largest gecko in the world; Phoboscincus bocourti, a large skink thought to be extinct until rediscovered in 2003.

Much of New Caledonia's fauna present before human settlement is now extinct, including Sylviornis, a bird over a metre tall not closely related to any living species, and Meiolania, a giant horned turtle that diverged from living turtles during the Jurassic period.

Demographics 

At the last census in 2019, New Caledonia had a population of 271,407. Of these, 18,353 live in the Loyalty Islands Province, 49,910 in the North Province, and 203,144 in the South Province. Population growth has slowed down recently with a yearly increase of 0.2% between 2014 and 2019.

Population growth is higher in the North Province (0.3% per year between 2014 and 2019) than in the Loyalty Islands Province (0.1%) and the South Province (−0.2%).

30% of the population is under 20, with the ratio of older people in the total population increasing. Two residents of New Caledonia out of three live in Greater Nouméa. 78% were born in New Caledonia. The total fertility rate went from 2.2 children per woman in 2014 to 1.9 in 2019.

Ethnic groups 

At the 2019 census, 41.2% of the population reported belonging to the Kanak community (up from 39.1% at the 2014 census) and 24.1% to the European (Caldoche and Zoreille) community (down from 27.2% at the 2014 census). A further 7.5% of the population either self-identified as "Caledonian" or refused to declare an ethnic group (down from 9.9% at the 2014 census). Most of the people who self-identify as "Caledonian" or refuse to declare an ethnic group are thought to be ethnically European.

The other self-reported communities were Wallisians and Futunians (8.3% of the total population, up from 8.2% at the 2014 census), Indonesians who are from the Javanese ethnic group (1.4% of the total population, the same as in 2014), Tahitians (2.0% of the total population, down from 2.1% at the 2014 census), Ni-Vanuatu (0.9%, down from 1.0% at the 2014 census), Vietnamese (0.8%, down from 0.9% at the 2014 census), and other Asians (primarily ethnic Chinese; 0.4% of the total population, the same as in 2014).

11.3% of the population reported belonging to multiple communities (mixed race) (up from 8.6% at the 2014 census). The question on community belonging, which had been left out of the 2004 census, was reintroduced in 2009 under a new formulation, different from the 1996 census, allowing multiple choices (mixed race) and the possibility to clarify the choice "other" (which led many Europeans to self-identify as "Caledonian" in the category "other", or to select several ethnic communities, such as both European and Kanak, thus appearing as mixed race, which is particularly the case for the Caldoches living in the bush, who often have mixed ancestry).

Finally, 2.1% of the population reported belonging to other communities to the exclusion of "Caledonian" (up from 1.3% at the 2014 census).

The Kanak people, part of the Melanesian group, are indigenous to New Caledonia. Their social organization is traditionally based on clans, which identify as either "land" or "sea" clans, depending on their original location and the occupation of their ancestors. According to the 2019 census, the Kanak constitute 95% of the population in the Loyalty Islands Province, 72% in the North Province and 29% in the South Province. The Kanak tend to be of lower socio-economic status than the Europeans and other settlers.

Europeans first settled in New Caledonia when France established a penal colony on the archipelago. Once the prisoners had completed their sentences, they were given land to settle. According to the 2014 census, of the 73,199 Europeans in New Caledonia, 30,484 were native-born, 36,975 were born in Metropolitan France, 488 were born in French Polynesia, 86 were born in Wallis and Futuna, and 5,166 were born abroad. The Europeans are divided into several groups: the Caldoches are usually defined as those born in New Caledonia who have ancestral ties that span back to the early French settlers. They often settled in the rural areas of the western coast of Grande Terre, where many continue to run large cattle properties.

Distinct from the Caldoches are those who were born in New Caledonia from families that had settled more recently, and are called simply Caledonians. The Metropolitan French-born migrants who come to New Caledonia are called Métros or Zoreilles, indicating their origins in metropolitan France. There is also a community of about 2,000 pieds noirs, descended from European settlers in France's former North African colonies; some of them are prominent in anti-independence politics, including Pierre Maresca, a leader of the RPCR.

A 2015 documentary by Al Jazeera English asserted that up to 10% of New Caledonia's population is descended from around 2,000 Arab-Berber people deported from French Algeria in the late 19th century to prisons on the island in reprisal for the Mokrani Revolt in 1871. After serving their sentences, they were released and given land to own and cultivate as part of colonisation efforts on the island. As the overwhelming majority of the Algerians imprisoned on New Caledonia were men, the community was continued through intermarriage with women of other ethnic groups, mainly French women from nearby women's prisons. Despite facing both assimilation into the Euro-French population and discrimination for their ethnic background, descendants of the deportees have succeeded in preserving a common identity as Algerians, including maintaining certain cultural practices (such as Arabic names) and in some cases Islamic religion. Some travel to Algeria as a rite of passage, though obtaining Algerian citizenship is often a difficult process. The largest population of Algerian-Caledonians lives in the commune of Bourail (particularly in the Nessadiou district, where there is an Islamic cultural centre and cemetery), with smaller communities in Nouméa, Koné, Pouembout, and Yaté.

Languages 

The French language began to spread with the establishment of French settlements, and French is now spoken even in the most secluded villages. For a long time the level of fluency varied significantly across the population as a whole, primarily due to the absence of universal access to public education before 1953, and also due to immigration and ethnic diversity, but the French language has now become universal among the younger generations as shown by the censuses of population. At the 2009 census, 97.3% of people aged 15 or older reported that they could speak, read and write French, whereas only 1.1% reported that they had no knowledge of French. No questions regarding the knowledge of French were asked in the 2014 and 2019 censuses due to the now almost universal knowledge of French. 

The 28 Kanak languages spoken in New Caledonia are part of the Oceanic group of the Austronesian family. Eight of these twenty eight Kanak languages can be chosen by parents as optional subjects for their children from kindergarten to high school (four languages are taught up to the bachelor's degree) and an academy is responsible for their promotion. The three most widely spoken indigenous languages are Drehu (spoken in Lifou), Nengone (spoken on Maré) and Paicî (northern part of Grande Terre). Others include Iaai (spoken on Ouvéa). At the 2019 census, 44.0% of people whose age was 15 or older reported that they had some form of knowledge of at least one Kanak language (up from 41.3% at the 2009 census), whereas 56.0% reported that they had no knowledge of any of the Kanak languages (down from 58.7% at the 2009 census).

Other significant language communities among immigrant populations include speakers of Wallisian, Futunian, Tahitian, Javanese, Vietnamese, Chinese, and Bislama.

Religion 

The predominant religion is Christianity; half of the population is Roman Catholic, including most of the Europeans, West Uveans, and Vietnamese and half of the Melanesian and Polynesian minorities. Roman Catholicism was introduced by French colonists. The island also has numerous Protestant churches, of which the Free Evangelical Church and the Evangelical Church in New Caledonia and the Loyalty Islands have the largest number of adherents; their memberships are almost entirely Melanesian. Protestantism gained ground in the late 20th century and continues to expand. There are also numerous other Christian groups and more than 6,000 Muslims. (See Islam in New Caledonia and Baháʼí Faith in New Caledonia.) Nouméa is the seat of the Roman Catholic Archdiocese of Nouméa.

Education 
Education in New Caledonia is based on the French curriculum and delivered by both French teachers and French-trained teachers. Under the terms of the 1998 Nouméa Accord, primary education is the responsibility of the three provinces. As of 2010, secondary education was in the process of being transferred to the provinces. The majority of schools are located in Nouméa but some are found in the islands and the north of New Caledonia. When students reach high school age, most are sent to Nouméa to continue their secondary education. Education is compulsory from the age of six years.

New Caledonia's main tertiary education institution is the University of New Caledonia (Université de la Nouvelle-Calédonie), which was founded in 1993 and comes under the supervision of the Ministry of Higher Education, Research and Innovation. It is based in Nouméa and offers a range of vocational, Bachelor, MA, and PhD programmes and courses. The University of New Caledonia consists of three academic departments, one institute of technology, one PhD school, and one teachers' college. As of 2013, the university has approximately 3,000 students, 107 academics, and 95 administrative and library staff. Many New Caledonian students also pursue scholarships to study in metropolitan France. As part of the Nouméa Accord process, a Cadre Avenir provides scholarships for Kanak professionals to study in France.

Economy 

New Caledonia has one of the largest economies in the South Pacific, with a GDP of US$9.44 billion in 2019. The nominal GDP per capita was US$34,780 (at market exchange rates) in 2019. It is lower than the nominal GDP per capita of Hawaii, Australia, New Zealand, and Guam, but higher than all other independent and non-sovereign countries and territories in Oceania, although there is significant inequality in income distribution, and long-standing structural imbalances between the economically dominant South Province and the less developed North Province and Loyalty Islands. The currency in use in New Caledonia is the CFP franc, as of May 2020, pegged to the euro at a rate of 119.3 CFP to 1.00 euros. It is issued by the Institut d’Émission d'Outre-Mer.

Real GDP grew by an average of +3.3% per year in the first half of the 2010s, boosted by rising worldwide nickel prices and an increase in domestic demand due to rising employment, as well as strong business investments, but by only +0.2% per year in the second half of the 2010s, as the local nickel industry entered a period of crisis and the repeated independence referendums have generated economic uncertainty. In 2011, exports of goods and services from New Caledonia amounted to 2.11 billion US dollars, 75.6% of which were mineral products and alloys (mainly nickel ore and ferronickel). Imports of goods and services amounted to 5.22 billion US dollars. 22.1% of the imports of goods came from Metropolitan France and its overseas departments, 16.1% from other countries in the European Union, 14.6% from Singapore (essentially fuel), 9.6% from Australia, 4.5% from the United States, 4.2% from New Zealand, 2.0% from Japan, and 27.0% from other countries. The trade deficit in goods and services stood at 3.11 billion US dollars in 2011.

Financial support from France is substantial, representing more than 15% of the GDP, and contributes to the health of the economy. Tourism is underdeveloped, with 100,000 visitors a year, compared to 400,000 in the Cook Islands and 200,000 in Vanuatu. Much of the land is unsuitable for agriculture, and food accounts for about 20% of imports. According to FAOSTAT, New Caledonia is a significant producer of: yams (33rd); taro (44th); plantains (50th); coconuts (52nd). The construction sector accounts for roughly 12% of GDP, employing 9.9% of the salaried population in 2010. Manufacturing is largely confined to small-scale activities such as the transformation of foodstuffs, textiles and plastics.

Nickel sector 

New Caledonian soils contain about 25% of the world's nickel resources. The late-2000s recession has gravely affected the nickel industry, as the sector faced a significant drop in nickel prices (−31.0% year-on-year in 2009) for the second consecutive year. The fall in prices has led a number of producers to reduce or stop altogether their activity, resulting in a reduction of the global supply of nickel by 6% compared to 2008.

This context, combined with bad weather, has forced the operators in the sector to revise downwards their production target. Thus, the activity of mineral extraction has declined by 8% in volume year on year. The share of the nickel sector as a percentage of GDP fell from 8% in 2008 to 5% in 2009. A trend reversal and a recovery in demand have been recorded early in the second half of 2009, allowing a 2.0% increase in the local metal production. A March 2020 report stated that "New Caledonia is the world's fourth largest nickel producer, which has seen a 26% rally in prices in the past year". According to industry sources however, the Goro mine has never met its potential capacity to produce "60,000 tpy of nickel in the form of nickel oxide, due to design flaws and operational commissioning issues" In 2019, it produced slightly over a third of its annual capacity".

In March 2021, Tesla agreed to a partnership with the Goro Mine, a "technical and industrial partnership to help with product and sustainability standards along with taking nickel for its battery production, according to the agreement", according to a BBC News report. The majority owner, Vale, said that the deal will be of long-term benefit in terms of jobs and the economy. Tesla is a heavy user of nickel for making the lithium-ion batteries and wanted to "secure its long-term supply".

Also in March 2021, a part of Vale's nickel business was sold "to a consortium called Prony, which includes Swiss commodity trader Trafigura". Provincial authorities and businesses in New Caledonia would have a 51% stake in the Vale operation.

Culture 

Wood carving, especially of the houp (Montrouziera cauliflora), is a contemporary reflection of the beliefs of the traditional tribal society, and includes totems, masks, chambranles, or flèche faîtière, a kind of arrow that adorns the roofs of Kanak houses. Basketry is a craft widely practised by tribal women, creating objects of daily use.

The Jean-Marie Tjibaou Cultural Centre, designed by Italian architect Renzo Piano and opened in 1998, is the icon of the Kanak culture.

The Kaneka is a form of local music, inspired by reggae and originating in the 1980s.

The Mwâ Ka is a  totem pole commemorating the French annexation of New Caledonia, and was inaugurated in 2005.

Media 
 is the only daily newspaper in the archipelago. A monthly publication, parodies the news from New Caledonia.

There are five radio stations: the public service broadcaster RFO radio Nouvelle-Calédonie, Océane FM (the collectivity's newest station), the youth-oriented station NRJ, Radio Djiido (established by Jean-Marie Tjibaou), and Radio Rythmes Bleus. The last two stations are primarily targeted to the various Kanak groups who are indigenous to New Caledonia ("Djiido" is a term from the Fwâi language, spoken in Hienghène in the North Province, denoting a metal spike used to secure straw thatching to the roof of a traditional Kanak house).

As for television, the public service broadcaster France Télévisions operates a local channel, Réseau Outre-Mer 1re, along with France 2, France 3, France 4, France 5, France 24 and Arte. Canal Plus Calédonie carries 17 digital channels in French, including Canal+ and TF1. Analogue television broadcasts ended in September 2011, completing the digital television transition in New Caledonia. Bids for two new local television stations, NCTV and NC9, were considered by the French broadcasting authorities. NCTV was launched in December 2013.

The media are considered to be able to operate freely, but Reporters Without Borders raised concerns in 2006 about "threats and intimidation" of RFO staff by members of a pro-independence group.

Sports 

The largest sporting event to be held in New Caledonia is a round of the FIA Asia Pacific Rally Championship (APRC).

The New Caledonia football team began playing in 1950, and was admitted into FIFA, the international association of football leagues, in 2004. Prior to joining FIFA, New Caledonia held observer status with the Oceania Football Confederation, and became an official member of the OFC with its FIFA membership. They have won the South Pacific Games five times, most recently in 2007, and have placed third on two occasions in the OFC Nations Cup. Christian Karembeu is a prominent New Caledonian former footballer. The under-17 team qualified for the FIFA under 17 World Cup in 2017.

The sport of basketball gets much public attention in New Caledonia by both press and fans. Its national team has won plenty of medals in the Oceania region. New Caledonia's top basketball club teams are AS 6e Km and AS Dumbea.

Horse racing is also very popular in New Caledonia, as are women's cricket matches.

The rugby league team participated in the Pacific Cup in 2004.  In 2020, plans were formed to create a Rugby League team in New Caledonia, Pacifique Trieze, to eventually join the majority Australian Queensland Cup.

New Caledonia also has a national synchronised swimming team, which tours abroad.

The "Tour Cycliste de Nouvelle-Calédonie" is a multi-day cycling stage race that is held usually in October. The race is organised by the Comite Cycliste New Caledonia. The race attracts riders from Australia, New Zealand, France, Réunion, Europe and Tahiti. Australian Brendan Washington has finished last three times in the race between 2005 and 2009, and is known in New Caledonia as "The Lanterne Rouge".

The New Caledonia Handball team won the Oceania Handball Nations Cup in 2008 held in Wellington, New Zealand. They beat Australia in the final.

The Internationaux de Nouvelle-Calédonie is a tennis tournament that is held in the first week of January. Since 2004, the tournament is part of the ATP Challenger Tour, and players usually compete as a preparation for the Australian Open. the first Grand Slam of the year.

The New Caledonia women's national volleyball team won the gold medal on several occasions.

Cuisine 
Due to low levels of domestic horticulture, fresh tropical fruits feature less highly in New Caledonian cuisine than in other Pacific nations, instead relying on rice, fish and root vegetables such as taro. One way this is frequently prepared is in a buried-oven-style feast, known as bougna. Wrapped in banana leaves, the fish, taro, banana and other seafood are buried with hot rocks to cook, then dug up and eaten.

Transport 

Most internal air services are operated by the International carrier Aircalin. Cruise ships dock at the Gare Maritime in Nouméa. The passenger-and-cargo boat Havannah sails to Port Vila, Malicolo and Santo in Vanuatu once a month.

New Caledonia's road network consists of:

 Route territoriale 1 (RT1), going from the exit from Nouméa to the Néhoué River, north of Koumac;
 Route territoriale 2, on Lifou Island and from the Lifou Airport to the south of Wé;
 Route territoriale 3, from the junction with RT1 in Nandi up to the Tiwaka River;
 Route territoriale 4, from the junction with RT1 near Muéo to the power plant.

See also

Explanatory notes

Footnotes

Citations

Sources

External links 

 Government of New Caledonia 
 New Caledonia : picture post card beautiful – Official Government of France website (in English)
 Tourism New Caledonia
 
 Biodiversité Néo-Calédonienne

 
Geography of Melanesia
Special territories of the European Union
Overseas collectivities of France
French-speaking countries and territories
Zealandia
Cannibalism in Oceania
States and territories established in 1853
Small Island Developing States
1853 establishments in Oceania